Kennedy McKinney (born January 10, 1966) is an American former professional boxer, who won the bantamweight gold medal at the 1988 Summer Olympics. As a professional, he won the IBF and WBO super bantamweight titles.

Military service 
McKinney took up boxing while serving in the U.S. Army, private first class stationed at the Aberdeen Proving Ground, Maryland.

Amateur career 
 1985 2nd place at United States Amateur Championships as a Flyweight, was stopped by Arthur Johnson
 1986 2nd place at United States Amateur Championships as a Flyweight, losing by decision to Arthur Johnson
 1987 3rd place at United States Amateur Championships as a Bantamweight, losing by decision to Michael Collins
 1988 2nd place at United States Amateur Championships as a Bantamweight, losing by decision to Jemal Hinton
 Prior to the 1988 Olympics had several international duals where he fought Alexei Artemiev of the Soviet Union, Rene Breitbarth of East Germany, Aleksandar Hristov of Bulgaria and Byun Jung-il of South Korea, to whom he lost.
 1988 qualified as a Bantamweight for the United States Olympic Team, avenging previous defeats versus Michael Collins, whom he beat three times and Jemal Hinton, all by decision.
 Won the Bantamweight Olympic Gold Medal at the Seoul Olympic Games. Results were:
 Defeated Erick Perez (Guatemala) TKO 1
 Defeated Shahuraj Birajdor (India) forfeit
 Defeated Steve Mwema (Kenya) points
 Defeated Phajol Moolsan (Thailand) TKO 1
 Defeated Aleksandar Hristov (Bulgaria) points
McKinney claimed an amateur record of 214 wins, 13 losses.

Professional career 
Known as "King", McKinney was a cautious yet exciting junior featherweight (super bantamweight) fighter who captured the IBF title by beating Welcome Ncita in 1992 in a spectacular bout that saw him staggered and taking a standing eight count before knocking the African cold with a perfect right hand.

After five defenses, among others a KO over Rudy Zavala and a points win over Ncita, he lost his belt to future star Vuyani Bungu, a fight which was deemed 1994 Upset of the Year by Ring Magazine.

Two years later he challenged undefeated Marco Antonio Barrera for the WBO super bantamweight title, a vicious battle in which he dropped Barrera in the 11th, but lost via TKO in the 12th.  McKinney later took a rematch against Bungu, but lost a narrow split decision. Later that year, he did battle with Junior Jones who had upset Barrera in an exciting war, one which McKinney won via TKO.

McKinney then moved up a weight class to challenge Luisito Espinosa for the WBC featherweight title in 1998.  Espinosa made quick work of McKinney, winning via a 2nd-round TKO.

After the loss to Espinosa, McKinney quickly lost steam.  He would fight only five more times against scattered and limited opposition, three of which took place during a brief comeback run in 2002-03.

Life after boxing
Kennedy now resides in Olive Branch, Mississippi, where he is simply known as "Coach McKinney". He is the Head Boxing Coach at the Prize Fight Gym in Southaven, Mississippi.

References 

 
 

|-

1966 births
African-American boxers
Living people
Boxers from Mississippi
Bantamweight boxers
Boxers at the 1988 Summer Olympics
Olympic boxers of the United States
Olympic gold medalists for the United States in boxing
People from Hernando, Mississippi
International Boxing Federation champions
World Boxing Organization champions
American male boxers
Medalists at the 1988 Summer Olympics
People from Olive Branch, Mississippi
United States Army soldiers
21st-century African-American people
20th-century African-American sportspeople